Trinity & St. Philip's Cathedral is a historic church located at Broad and Rector Streets in Military Park in the city of Newark in Essex County, New Jersey, United States.  It is the seat of the Episcopal Diocese of Newark. The church building was added to the National Register of Historic Places on November 3, 1972, for its significance in architecture and religion. It was added as a contributing property to the Military Park Commons Historic District on June 18, 2004.

History
The first services for colonists who had settled in Newark were conducted by visiting priests starting in 1729. They organized Trinity Church and built a small stone church building with a steeple in 1743. A charter was granted by King George II in 1746.  The building was used as a hospital for both British and American troops during the American Revolutionary War.  It sustained damage during the conflict and the present building was planned and built.  It was completed in 1810.  A chancel and sanctuary were added to the east end in 1857.  Trinity Church was elevated to cathedral status in 1944.  St. Philip's Church, a predominantly African American parish on High and West Market Streets, was destroyed in a fire in 1964.  Two years later the two congregations were merged.  The Very Rev. Dillard Robinson was elected dean in 1968.  He was the first African American to serve as a cathedral dean in the United States.  The name "St. Philip's" was added to the cathedral name in 1992.

See also 
List of the Episcopal cathedrals of the United States
List of cathedrals in the United States
 National Register of Historic Places listings in Essex County, New Jersey

References

External links
 
 

Churches in Newark, New Jersey
Churches on the National Register of Historic Places in New Jersey
Georgian architecture in New Jersey
Gothic Revival church buildings in New Jersey
Religious organizations established in 1743
Churches completed in 1810
19th-century Episcopal church buildings
Episcopal church buildings in New Jersey
Episcopal cathedrals in New Jersey
National Register of Historic Places in Newark, New Jersey
New Jersey Register of Historic Places
1743 establishments in the Thirteen Colonies
Historic district contributing properties in New Jersey
Historic district contributing properties in Newark, New Jersey
Individually listed contributing properties to historic districts on the National Register in New Jersey
Historic American Buildings Survey in New Jersey